Markela Bejleri (born 28 May 2001) is a footballer who plays as a midfielder for North Mississauga SC in League1 Ontario. Born in Canada, she represents the Albania women's national team.

College career
In 2019, she began playing for the Quinnipiac Bobcats. She scored her first goal on September 1, 2019 against the Loyola Greyhounds. She was an MAAC All-Academic Team in 2020 and 2021, a 2021 All-MAAC Second Team, and a 2021 NEWISA All-New England Third Team.

Club career
In 2018 and 2019, she played for Aurora FC in League1 Ontario. She scored a brace, including her first goal in League1 Ontario, on May 12, 2018 in a 3-0 victory over Toronto Azzurri Blizzard. In 2018, she led the team in scoring and was named the League1 Ontario Young Player of the Year, as well as a League Third-Team All-Star.

In 2022, she played for North Mississauga SC in League1 Ontario.

International career
In 2017, she was attended a camp with the Canada U17 team.

Later in 2017, she played with the Albania U19. In 2018, she earned her first callup to the Albania senior team for World Cup qualification. She made her senior debut on March 11, 2020 in a World Cup qualifier against Cyprus.

See also
List of Albania women's international footballers

References

External links
Markela Bejleri at Albanian Football Association

2001 births
Living people
Albanian women's footballers
Women's association football midfielders
Quinnipiac Bobcats women's soccer players
Albania women's international footballers
Albanian expatriate footballers
Albanian expatriate sportspeople in the United States
Soccer players from Toronto
Canadian women's soccer players
Canadian expatriate women's soccer players
Canadian expatriate sportspeople in the United States
Expatriate women's soccer players in the United States
Canadian people of Albanian descent
Aurora FC (Canada) players
League1 Ontario (women) players
North Mississauga SC (women) players